Michelle Burke (born Michelle Gray; November 30, 1970) is an American actress.  She is best known for her roles as Jodi Kramer in the 1993 Richard Linklater film Dazed and Confused  and as Connie Conehead in the 1993 movie Coneheads.  She also appeared in the 1994 sequel to Major League, Major League II.

Burke's hobbies include collecting antiques and playing the guitar.

Burke is sometimes credited as Michelle Rene Thomas and Michelle Thomas, especially in works after 1997.

Personal life
Burke is married to Ringside band member Scott Thomas. They have three children.

Filmography

References

External links

American film actresses
American television actresses
American collectors
People from Defiance, Ohio
1970 births
Living people
Women collectors
Actresses from Ohio
21st-century American women